Gor is the alternate-world setting for a novel series by John Norman.

Gor or GOR may also refer to:

Fiction and mythology
 Gor (film), a science fiction and fantasy film, 1987
 Gor Saga, a 1981 novel by Maureen Duffy, televised as First Born
 Gór, a legendary Norse ancestral hero, brother of Nór
 Gor, a mythical elephant in Pygmy Mbuti mythology

Given name 
 Gor Agbaljan (born 1997), Armenian footballer
 Gor Malakyan (born 1994), Armenian footballer
 Gor Minasyan (born 1994), Armenian weightlifter
 Gor Mkhitarian (born 1973), Armenian musician
 Gor Sujyan (born 1987), Armenian singer

Surname 
 Avika Gor (born 1997), Indian actress
 Gennady Gor (1907–1981), Russian writer
 Lokman Gör (born 1990), Turkish footballer
 Priyal Gor (born 1994), Indian actress
 Pooja Gor (born 1991), Indian actress
 Yakup Gör (born 1988), Turkish wrestler

Maritime
 Global Ocean Race, a yachting race
 Gor-class gunboat, in the Royal Norwegian Navy, 1884–1887 
 , two ships of the Royal Norwegian Navy

Places
 Gōr, an ancient city in Iran
 Gor, Granada, Spain
 Gór, Hungary
 Gor, Sikkim, India
 Gor, an ancient city, now Drâa-El-Gamra, Tunisia

Codes
 GOR, the IATA code for Gore Airport in Ethiopia
 gor, the ISO 639-2 and -3 codes for the Gorontalo language spoken on Sulawesi, Indonesia 
 GOR, the London Underground code for Goldhawk Road tube station in London, UK
 GOR, the National Rail code for Goring & Streatley railway station in Oxfordshire, UK

Other uses
 Gor language, spoken in Chad
 GOR method, in bioinformatics
 Gas oil ratio
 German Operations Research Society
 Gor Mahia F.C., a football club based in Nairobi, Kenya
 Duke of Gor, a Spanish title of nobility

See also 
 
 
 
 Goar (disambiguation)
 Goor, a town of Enschede in the Dutch province of Overijssel
 Gore (disambiguation)
 Goring (disambiguation)
 Gorr (disambiguation)